Kajala Masanja is an actress and film star in Tanzania.  She won the 2016 EATV (East Africa Television) award for actress. She was married to former banker Faraji Chambo.

She appeared in the 2012 film Kijiji Cha Tambua Haki with Steven Kanumba. She is the subject of industry gossip.

She was in Basilisa (2011) and Jeraha la Moyo (2012).

Filmography

Kigodoro 
Jeraha la Moyo 
House Boy 
Vita Baridi 
House Girl & Boy 
Dhuluma 
Shortcut 
Basilisa 
You Me and Him 
Devils Kingdom

See also
Cinema of Tanzania

References

Living people
Tanzanian actresses
21st-century Tanzanian actresses
Year of birth missing (living people)